Eliasch is a surname. Notable people with the surname include:

Amanda Eliasch (born 1960), English photographer, artist, poet and filmmaker
Johan Eliasch (born 1962), Swedish businessman